Coastal India is a geo-cultural region in the Indian subcontinent that spans the entire coastline of India.(7516.6 km; Mainland: 5422.6 km, Island Territories: 2094 km)

Region

Coastal India spans from the south west Indian coastline along the Arabian sea from the coastline of the Gulf of Kutch in its westernmost corner and stretches across the Gulf of Khambhat, and through the Salsette Island of Mumbai along the Konkan and southwards across the Raigad district region and through Kanara and further down through Mangalore and along the Malabar through Cape Comorin in the southernmost region of South India with  coastline along the Indian Ocean and through the Coromandal Coast or Cholamandalam.
The coastline on the South Eastern part of the Indian Subcontinent along the Bay of Bengal through the Utkala Kalinga region extends until the easternmost Corner of shoreline near the Sunderbans in Coastal East India.
There are many beaches and springs here, as well as beautiful sea and oceans like the Arabian Sea.

People

The people along coastal India exhibit vast diversity along an underlying commonality as a result of its coastal topography and sea trade between west Asian Mediterranean traders along its west coastline.
The region includes Gujaratis in the westernmost region, Kannadigas, Tuluvas, Konkanis and Maharashtrians along the Konkan coast or the western coastline, Malayalis in its southernmost region of South India, the Tamilians along southern Cholamandalam coast, the Telugus and Odia people along the South eastern coast through Utkala Kalinga region along the Circar coast, and the Bengali people along the easternmost coastline along the Bay of Bengal.

Thriving sea trade and intermingling

A thriving trade existed between the Mediterranean world and Coastal Indian regions  This led to significant intermingling between the people of Coastal India and the west asian world, particularly along the South West Indian Coastline along the Arabian Sea. Several west Asian communities have also settled and become part of the diversity of coastal south west India. These include the Parsis, Bohras and Baghdadi Jews in the westernmost region, the Bene Israel along the South western region, the descendants of mediterranean traders along Coorg and Mangalore, the Jonakan Mappilas  along Malabar region, and the cochin jews and Syriac Nasranis along the southernmost region of South India. This brought South Indian Heritage to Cambodia, Indonesia and Bali where the Balinese Hindu traditions still thrives. This also lead to intermingling between coastal India and the south east Asia particularly in the South eastern Cholamandalam coastline along the Bay of Bengal.

Heritage

The linguistic diversity of Coastal India includes languages of the Dravidian language family including Malayalam, Tamil, Telugu, Tulu and Kannada; languages belonging to the western zone of Indo Iranian language families including Gujarati, Marathi, Konkani, languages belonging to the central zone of the Indo-Iranian language families including Urdu and Persian and languages belonging to the eastern zone of Indo Iranian language family including Odia and Bengali. The region also has speakers of Semitic languages like Arabic, Hebrew and Aramaic. The common elements of the people of coastal India includes cuisine that consists of agrarian and coastal products and clothing that involves long flowing drapes with bare midriff for both men and women suited for humid and warm climate. Throughout coastal India women wear drapes called saree in various styles. In the western corner of the region the drapes are called as Dhoti for men.  and Chaniya choli for women, further southwards the drapes are called as lungi or mundu for men.  and veshti for women. Towards the southernmost tip of coastal south western India the social system of inheritance was once matrilineal. There are various festivals celebrated in the coastal states centered on deities.

Tourism

The tourism is enabled by numerous 
islands, beaches and coral reefs in coastal India, full potential of which is yet to be exploited.

Gallery

See also

 Borders of India
 Climate of India
 Exclusive economic zone of India
 Fishing in India
 Outline of India

References

Regions of India